The Men's 100 metre backstroke S12 event at the 2020 Paralympic Games took place on 27 August 2021, at the Tokyo Aquatics Centre.

Final

References

Swimming at the 2020 Summer Paralympics